Turkish Airlines Flight 1019 was a scheduled flight from Istanbul Airport to Prishtina International Airport, with 143 passengers and 8 crew. On May 2, 2016, the Boeing 737-800 overran the Prishtina International Airport runway. No one was injured.

Accident 
Flight 1019 landed at Prishtina International Airport on runway 35 at 7:32 pm, but went left towards the end of the runway and overran. The aircraft came to a stop of 40 meters past the runway.

Aftermath 
The airport was closed immediately after the incident and opened at 1:00 pm after being closed for 17 hours.

Investigation 
Kosovo's Aeronautical Accident and Incident Investigation Commission (KAAIIC) opened an investigation into the occurrence. The NTSB (USA) and the Turkish DGAC (Turkey), also joined the investigation.

Two days after the incident, touchdown marks were identified about 1500 meters down the 2500 meter long runway.

On November 1, 2016, Germany's BFU reported that they have joined the investigation, due to a request from Kosovo's Aeronautical Accident and Incident Investigation Commission.

In 2018 Kosovo's Aeronautical Accident and Incident Investigation Commission released their final report, concluding the cause of the overrun was due to high runway threshold crossing altitude combined with a long flare and late touchdown beyond the touchdown zone. The flight crew did not initiate a go-around procedure. This would have stopped this incident from occurring.

References 

2016 in Kosovo
Aviation accidents and incidents in 2016
Aviation accidents and incidents in Kosovo